The John F. Nichols House is a historic house in Somerville, Massachusetts. The 2.5-story wood-frame house was built c. 1890, and is a well preserved Queen Anne Victorian. The house as a prominent corner bay which is topped by a steeply pitched gable roof. There is also a front gable dormer and side shed dormers on what is otherwise a hipped roof. The gable ends are decorated with jigsaw woodwork, as is the front porch.

The house was listed on the National Register of Historic Places in 1989.

See also 
 National Register of Historic Places listings in Somerville, Massachusetts

References 

Houses on the National Register of Historic Places in Somerville, Massachusetts